Sir Nigel Anthony Lamert Davis, PC (born 10 March 1951) is a former Lord Justice of Appeal.

Education
Davis was educated at Charterhouse School and University College, Oxford.

Career
Davis was called to the Bar (Lincoln's Inn) in 1975. In 1992, he became a Queen's Counsel. He was appointed a Recorder in 1998. The next year, he was named a Deputy High Court Judge. Davis was appointed to the High Court of Justice on 1 October 2001 and assigned to the Queen's Bench Division; he was knighted the same year. He served as a Presiding Judge for the Wales Circuit from 2006 to 2009. In 2011, he was appointed a Lord Justice of Appeal effective 4 October 2011, and it was announced he would receive the customary appointment to the Privy Council. He retired as Lord Justice of Appeal with effect from 10 March 2021

References 

1951 births
Living people
People educated at Charterhouse School
Alumni of University College, Oxford
Queen's Bench Division judges
Knights Bachelor
Lords Justices of Appeal
21st-century Welsh judges
Members of the Privy Council of the United Kingdom